Alexander White Gregg (January 31, 1855 – April 30, 1919) was a Democratic member of the United States House of Representatives between 1903 and 1919.

Gregg was born in Centerville, Texas on January 31, 1855. As a child, he went to a public school. He attended King College in Bristol, Tennessee, graduating in 1874 and later studied law at the University of Virginia at Charlottesville. He was admitted to the Texas bar in 1878 and commenced practice in Palestine, Texas.

Gregg served in the Texas Senate between 1886 and 1888. He ran for Texas's 7th congressional district, and held a seat there between 1903 - 1919. He served as Chairman of the Committee on War Claims (1913–1919). He did not run for re-election in 1918 and died a month after his term ended in Palestine, Texas, and is buried in East Hill Cemetery.

References

1855 births
1919 deaths
Democratic Party members of the United States House of Representatives from Texas
19th-century American politicians